Henrique Nuno Pires Severiano Teixeira (born November 5, 1957, in Portuguese Guinea) is a Portuguese academic and politician. Severiano Teixeira is a full professor at New University of Lisbon, and was also the vice rector of the same institution. He is director of the Portuguese Institute of International Relations (IPRI), an academic research institute that belongs to NOVA University of Lisbon. He is currently a visiting professor at Georgetown University.

Nuno Severiano Teixeira was Minister of Internal Administration in the 14th Constitutional Government, the second of the Prime Minister António Guterres. He was also Minister of Defense in the 17th Constitutional Government, the first of the Prime Minister José Sócrates.

Severiano Teixeira is the author of several publications in the fields of Military History, International Relations, Security and Defense, and European Integration.

Background 
Nuno Severiano Teixeira was born in Portuguese Guinea, in 1957, when his father was serving in military mission. He is a descendant of Colonel José Manuel Severiano Teixeira, who was awarded Commander of the Order of Avis, in 1989.

Nuno Severiano Teixeira was also awarded. He received the Grade of Commander of the Order of Prince Henry the Navigator, and also the Grand Cross of the Order of Prince Henry the Navigator.

The former Minister graduated in History in 1981, from the Faculty of Arts of the University of Lisbon, and holds a PhD in History of International Relations from the European University Institute, Florence, 1994. Nuno Severiano Teixeira has also the Habilitation degree in Political Science and International Affairs, from the New University of Lisbon.

Severiano Teixeira began teaching in the 1980s, as a professor at the School of Social Sciences of the University of Évora, between 1982 and 1994. He also taught at the History Department of the Institute of Labor Science and Enterprise in Lisbon (ISCTE-IUL), between 2002 and 2006, and at the Portuguese Catholic University, between 1998 and 2013. He is currently Professor in the Department of Political Studies at NOVA University of Lisbon.

As a visiting professor he taught at Georgetown University (2000), at the Institute of European Studies, University of California, Berkeley (2003-2004), and at the Robert Schuman Centre for Advanced Studies of the European University Institute, in Florence (2010).

Nuno Severiano Teixeira was Director of the National Defense Institute between 1996 and 2000.

Duties in the Government of Portugal
 Minister of Internal Administration in the 14th Constitutional Government of Portugal (2000-2002).
 Minister of National Defense in the 17th Constitutional Government (2005 – 2009).

Honours 
 Commander of the Order of Prince Henry, Portugal (27 July 2000)
 Grand Cross of the Order of Prince Henry, Portugal (30 January 2006)

Publications 
 História Militar de Portugal, A Esfera dos Livros, Lisboa, 2017 
 Heróis do Mar, História dos Símbolos Nacionais, A Esfera dos Livros Editora, Lisboa, 2015.
 História Contemporânea de Portugal, Volume 3, “A Crise do Liberalismo 1890-1930”, Fundação Mapfre, (Coordenação), Lisboa, 2014.
 The Europeanization of Portuguese Democracy, SSM - Columbia University Press, Nova Iorque, 2012, com António Costa Pinto (ed.).
 The International Politics of Democratization, Routledge Research in Comparative Politics, 2008.
 Portugal e a Integração Europeia, 1945–1986: a perspectiva dos actores, Lisboa: Temas e Debates, 2007, com António Costa Pinto (ed.).
 Os Militares e a Democracia, Edições Colibri, 2007, (Coordenação).
 Nova História Militar de Portugal, 5 Volumes, Círculo de Leitores, Lisboa, 2003-2004.
 Southern Europe and the Making of European Union, SSM, Columbia University Press, Nova Iorque, 2002, com António Costa Pinto (ed.)
 L'Entrée du Portugal dans la Grande Guerre, Objectifs Nationaux et Stratégies Politiques, Ed. Economica, Paris, 1998.
 Portugal e a Guerra: História das Intervenções Militares Portuguesas nos Grandes Conflitos Mundiais (Séculos XIX e XX), Edições Colibri, Lisboa, 1998.
 O Poder e a Guerra 1914-1918: Objetivos Nacionais e Estratégias Políticas na Entrada de Portugal na Grande Guerra, Editorial Estampa, Lisboa, 1996.
 O Ultimatum Inglês: Política Externa e Política Interna no Portugal de 1890, Publicações Alfa, Lisboa, 1990.

References

External links
Biography on Portugal.gov.pt

1957 births
Living people
Government ministers of Portugal
Socialist Party (Portugal) politicians
Socialist Party (Portugal) MEPs
MEPs for Portugal 2009–2014
Academic staff of the University of Évora
European University Institute alumni